The 2017–18 Indiana State Sycamores women's basketball team represents Indiana State University during the 2017–18 NCAA Division I women's basketball season. The Sycamores, led by interim head coach Josh Keister, play their home games at the Hulman Center and were members of the Missouri Valley Conference. They finished the season 11–19, 9–9 in MVC play to finish in fifth place. They lost in the quarterfinals of the Missouri Valley women's tournament to Southern Illinois.

Previous season
They finished the season 12–18, 6–12 in MVC play to finish in eighth place. They lost in the first round of the Missouri Valley women's tournament to Illinois State.

Roster

Schedule

|-
!colspan=9 style=| Exhibition

|-
!colspan=9 style=| Non-conference regular season

|-
!colspan=9 style=| Missouri Valley Conference regular season

|-
!colspan=9 style=| Missouri Valley Women's Tournament

See also
2017–18 Indiana State Sycamores men's basketball team

References

Indiana State Sycamores women's basketball seasons
Indiana State
Indiana State
Indiana State